The August 2020 Mogadishu bombing was a suicide car bombing on 8 August 2020 at the gates of the 12th April Army Brigade military base close to the recently reopened Mogadishu sports stadium in the Warta Nabadda district of Mogadishu. The attack killed at least eight people and wounded fourteen others. The jihadist group al-Shabaab claimed responsibility for the attack.

See also
2020 Afgooye bombing

Reference

2020 murders in Somalia
21st century in Mogadishu
21st-century mass murder in Somalia
Al-Shabaab (militant group) attacks in Mogadishu
August 2020 crimes in Africa
Attacks on military installations in the 2020s
Islamic terrorist incidents in 2020
Mass murder in 2020
Mass murder in Mogadishu
Suicide bombings in 2020
Suicide bombings in Mogadishu
Terrorist incidents in Somalia in 2020